Idanthyrsus (Ancient Greek: ,;) is the name of a Scythian king who lived in the 6th century BCE, when he faced an invasion of his country by the Persian Achaemenid Empire.

Name and etymology
The name  is the Hellenized form of a Scythian name whose original form is not attested.

Life

Background
Idanthyrsus was the son of his predecessor, the Scythian king Saulius, who was himself the brother and slayer of Anacharsis.

Persian invasion
When Darius I of Persia invaded Scythia, about 513 BC, and the Scythians retreated before him, he sent a message to Idanthyrsus, calling upon him either to fight or submit. The Scythian king answered that, in fleeing before the Persians, he was not urged by fear, but was merely living the wandering/nomadic life to which he was accustomed, that there was no reason why he should fight the Persians, as he had neither cities for them to take nor lands.

He, however did reply, "But if all you want is to come to fight, we have the graves of our fathers. Come on, find these and try to destroy them: you shall know then whether we will fight you."

In his Histories, Herodotus writes the following about the dialogue between the Persian king and Idanthyrsus (2015 publication, Knopf Doubleday Publishing Group);

To which the Scythian king replied;

Legacy
Graeco-Roman authors confused several early Scythian kings such as Išpakaia, Protothyes, and Madyes, into a single figure, also named Madyes, who led Scythians into defeating the Medes and the legendary Egyptian king Sesōstris, before imposing their rule over Asia for many years before returning to Scythia. Later Graeco-Roman authors named this Scythian king as Idanthyrsos or Tanausis, although this Idanthyrsos is a legendary figure separate from the later historical Scythian king Idanthyrsos, from whom the Graeco-Romans derived merely his name.

Explanatory notes

References

Scythian rulers
6th-century BC rulers
Foreign contacts of ancient Egypt
Achaemenid Thrace